Kvemo-Machkhara former settlement in the Java district of South Ossetia. Presently ruins remain.

See also
 Dzau district

References 

Populated places in Dzau District